A Matter of Time is the debut album by Australian hip hop group Hilltop Hoods, released in 1999.

The promotion, manufacturing and marketing of the album was funded by a grant from the band's local government and resulted in the band once it became successful setting up its own grant scheme for South Australian hip hop musicians.

The album is currently out of press, but is available as a free download from the Hilltop Hoods official site.

The quote used in the song, "A Matter of Time", is taken from the 1994 movie The Shawshank Redemption, where Morgan Freeman's character, Ellis Boyd "Red" Redding, says to Tim Robbins's character, Andrew "Andy" Dufresne, "That's all it takes, just pressure and time".

Track listing
Songwriting credits from Australasian Performing Right Association (APRA).
 "A Matter of Time" (D. Smith, M. Lambert) – 4:35
 "1979" (M. Lambert) – 3:53
 "The Anthem" (D. Smith, M. Lambert) – 4:13
 "Time Wasted" – 0:39
 "B-Boy Battlegear" (M. Lambert) – 3:01
 "Give It Up" (D. Smith, M. Lambert) – 3:19
 "Clap Your Hands to The..." – 1:10
 "Let Me Show You" – 3:32
 "Deaf Can Hear" (featuring Bukue One) (D. Smith, T. Torrance, M. Lambert) – 4:00
 "Common Streets" (D. Smith) – 3:29
 "A Matter of Time" (instrumental remix) – 2:18
 "1979" (remix) (M. Lambert) – 3:31
 "Whatcha Got?" (D. Smith, M. Lambert) – 4:03
 "Whatcha Got?" (instrumental remix) – 1:19

Personnel
 Daniel Smith (Pressure)
 Matthew Lambert (Suffa)
 Barry Francis (DJ Debris)
 Tion Torrance (Bukue One) — track 9

Credits
 Producer:Barry Francis — tracks 1, 2, 3, 4, 5, 6, 8, 9, 10, 11Matthew Lambert — tracks 1, 2, 4, 5, 6, 9, 10, 11, 12Daniel Smith — track 11Chris Lambert — track 13
 Mastered: Neville Clarke
 Mixed: Barry Francis, Matthew Lambert
 Artwork: Chris Lambert, J. Englehardt

References

Albums free for download by copyright owner
Hilltop Hoods albums
1999 debut albums